The Gulf Coast League Athletics were a minor league baseball team, that played in Bradenton, Florida from 1967-1968. The club played in the rookie-level Gulf Coast League as an affiliate of the Kansas City/Oakland Athletics. The GCL Athletics won the Gulf Coast League title in both years of their existence.

Season-by-season

Baseball teams established in 1967
Baseball teams disestablished in 1968
Defunct Florida Complex League teams
Athletics
Kansas City Athletics minor league affiliates
Oakland Athletics minor league affiliates
1967 establishments in Florida
1968 disestablishments in Florida